Girona FC are a Spanish professional association football club based in Girona, who currently play in La Liga. The list covers the period from 1930, when the club was founded, to the present day. It details the club's achievements in senior league and cup competitions, and the top scorers for each season.

Key

Pld = Matches played
W = Matches won
D = Matches drawn
L = Matches lost
GF = Goals for
GA = Goals against
Pts = Points
Pos = Final position

Segunda = Segunda División
Segunda B = Segunda División B
Tercera = Tercera División
Primera = Primera Catalana
Catalan 1st = The Catalan 1st Division, a regional football league organised due to the Spanish Civil War
n/a = Not applicable

QR = Qualifying round
1R = First Round
2R = Second Round
3R = Third Round
4R = Fourth Round
5R = Fifth Round
6R = Sixth Round
R32 = Round of 32
R16 = Round of 16
QF = Quarter-finals
SF = Semi-finals
RU = Runners-up
W = Winners

Seasons

Footnotes
All goals in competitive matches included. Goals scored in friendly matches do not count.
Eliminated in the group stage of the play-offs.
Eliminated in the first eliminatory stage of the play-offs.
Eliminated in the second eliminatory stage of the play-offs.
Eliminated in the semi-finals of the play-offs.
Eliminated in the finals of the play-offs.
Promoted via the play-offs.
Did not qualify directly for promotion through league or play-off performance but was promoted anyway due to league reorganisation.
Did not qualify directly for relegation through league or play-off performance but was relegated anyway due to league reorganisation.

References

Seasons
Girona FC
Association football lists by Spanish club